Sphenophryne rubra is a species of frog in the family Microhylidae. It is endemic to New Guinea and is only known from the Kubor and Bismarck Ranges in the New Guinea Highlands, Papua New Guinea. The habitat and ecology of this species known from very few specimens are unknown.

References

rubra
Amphibians of New Guinea
Amphibians of Papua New Guinea
Endemic fauna of New Guinea
Endemic fauna of Papua New Guinea
Amphibians described in 2000
Taxa named by Richard G. Zweifel
Taxonomy articles created by Polbot